Kejdonia is a genus of sea snails, marine gastropod mollusks in the family Pyramidellidae, the pyrams and their allies.

Species
Species within the genus Kejdonia include:
 Kejdonia cachiai (Mifsud, 1998)

References

  Mifsud C. (1998). Pseudographis cachiai n. gen. & n. sp. , and Cima melitensis n. sp. : two new species of Heterostropha (Mollusca, Gastropoda) from the Maltese islands. La Conchiglia 286: 25-29
 Oberling, J.-J. (1971). Quelques taxa nouveaux ou mal compris de microgastéropodes méditerranéens. Naturhistorisches Museum Bern. Kleine Mitteilungen. 2(3): 1-8
 Gofas, S.; Le Renard, J.; Bouchet, P. (2001). Mollusca. in: Costello, M.J. et al. (eds), European Register of Marine Species: a check-list of the marine species in Europe and a bibliography of guides to their identification. Patrimoines Naturels. 50: 180-213

External links
 To World Register of Marine Species

Pyramidellidae
Monotypic gastropod genera